Columbia College is a public community college in Sonora, California. Established in September 1968 as Columbia Junior College, the college dropped "Junior" from its name in 1978. It is accredited by the Accrediting Commission for Community and Junior Colleges.

This college is a part of the Yosemite Community College District.

The architectural style of the college is that of California during the Gold Rush era. The college has a fire department on campus that is staffed by an on duty crew of at least two personnel daily.

History
In 1954, the district electorate decided to expand the former Modesto Junior College District  into a larger area stretching out to the Yosemite Community College District. This is one of the largest districts in the state, geographically. It covers more than 100 miles of the San Joaquin Valley on the west to the Sierra Nevada on the east. Its area of almost 4,000 square miles includes Tuolumne, Stanislaus County, and areas from San Joaquin, Merced, Calaveras, and Santa Clara County.

Student enrollment was increasing and the need for more schools in these mountainous areas increased. The long-distance travel required for students to attend Modesto Junior College was very difficult. The high demand caused the Community College District Board of Trustees to authorize the formation of Columbia Junior College and its opening in 1968. In 1978, the school removed the word 'Junior' from its name.

References

California Community Colleges
Sonora, California
Universities and colleges in Tuolumne County, California
Schools accredited by the Western Association of Schools and Colleges
Educational institutions established in 1968
1968 establishments in California